The 1993 Southwest Conference men's basketball tournament was held March 13–0, 1993, at Reunion Arena in Dallas, Texas. 

Number 5 seed Texas Tech defeated 3 seed  88-76 to win their 4th championship and receive the conference's automatic bid to the 1993 NCAA tournament.

Format and seeding 
The tournament consisted of the top 8 teams playing in a single-elimination tournament.

Tournament

References 

1992–93 Southwest Conference men's basketball season
Basketball in the Dallas–Fort Worth metroplex
Southwest Conference men's basketball tournament